Deshabandu Asanka Pradeep Gurusinha (born 16 September 1966) is a Sri Lankan Australian former international cricketer who had an 11-year international career, playing 41 Tests and 147 One Day Internationals for Sri Lanka. He was a key member for 1996 Cricket World Cup winning team for Sri Lanka, who is a specialist batsman helped to win the 1996 World Cup final with 65 in a partnership of 125 with the final's Man of the Match, Aravinda de Silva.

He was educated at Isipathana College, Colombo & Nalanda College Colombo and had been residing in Melbourne, Australia. He was formerly the manager of the Sri Lanka national cricket team and a member of the selection committee. In December 2020, he was appointed as head coach of Nigeria national cricket team. In 2022 he was announced as the senior coach of Victorian Premier Cricket club Essendon.

International career

Early career
Gurusinha was called up at 19 as a wicket-keeper, a role he took in a further two ODIs and one Test. He gradually established himself as a No. 3 batsman, playing 33 Tests and 109 ODIs in that position, and was described by Simon Wilde of Cricinfo as "the rock on which Sri Lankan batting was founded". He was also known for his big stature and wide stance when batting.

Late career
Gurusinha was one of the main pillars of Sri Lanka's 1996 World Cup winning Batting line up. His application at the crisis situations to drag the team scorecard was a major highlight for those who watched the World Series tournament back in 1996.

Asanka is the 32nd Sri Lanka Test Cap, making his debut against Pakistan in Karachi in 1985/86. He was also a useful part-time bowler, with Michael Atherton, Sunil Gavaskar, Dean Jones, Steve Waugh and Inzamam-ul-Haq among his 20 Test wickets.

He was the first Sri Lankan to score a test century at Seddon Park.

Coaching career
He is a Level 3 certified Cricket Coach, and was also the Consultant Regional Cricket Coach for Cricket Australia. Gurusinha was appointed  as the Manager for the National Cricket Team of Sri Lanka in 2017. However, with consecutive defeats to India in all formats, Gurusinha along with the selection committee resigned from their positions on 29 August 2017. The resignation did not last for a week, where on 19 September 2017, Gurusinha was re-appointed as the selector, along with three new selectors - Graeme Labrooy, Jeryl Woutersz, Gamini Wickremasinghe, and Sajith Fernando.

In December 2020, he was appointed as head coach of Nigeria national cricket team. He resigned in April 2022.

International centuries

Key

Test centuries

ODI centuries

References

External links
 
 President To Honor Sri Lankan Cricketers (1 Nov 1996)
 National Awards Conferred by His Excellency the President of Sri Lanka

 "'Gura’ Observer Schoolboy Cricketer of 1985 starred in Lanka’s World Cup triumph in 1996:by Leslie Fernando"

Sri Lanka Test cricketers
Sri Lanka One Day International cricketers
1966 births
Living people
Basnahira South cricketers
Nondescripts Cricket Club cricketers
Sinhalese Sports Club cricketers
Sri Lankan Buddhists
Alumni of Nalanda College, Colombo
Alumni of Isipathana College
Sri Lankan emigrants to Australia
Deshabandu
Salespeople
Coaches of the Nigeria national cricket team
Sri Lankan expatriates in Nigeria